John Sheran (born 8 August 1960, in Torphins) is a Scottish former football player and manager.

Sheran made over 300 playing appearances in the Scottish Football League for Montrose. He was appointed assistant manager of the club in 1998 and became their manager in 2000. Sheran was sacked by Montrose in October 2003. He then managed Highland League club Cove Rangers. He was appointed manager of Peterhead in March 2011, but was sacked in September after the team started the 2011–12 season badly.

On 10 May 2014 Sheran rejoined Cove Rangers to become their new manager. Cove won the Highland League in both 2017–18 and 2018–19. Shortly after the team was presented with the 2018–19 championship, Sheran suffered a heart attack. During the 2019 close season, Sheran advised Cove Rangers that he could not continue as their manager. The club moved Sheran to a director of football role, with Paul Hartley succeeding him as manager.

Managerial statistics

 statistics based on soccerbase website.

Honours

Manager

Cove Rangers
Highland Football League (3): 2015-16, 2017-18, 2018-19
Highland League Cup (3): 2014-15, 2016–17, 2018–19
Aberdeenshire Shield : 2017-18
Aberdeenshire Cup : 2018-19
Scottish League Two play-offs : 2018-19

References

Sources
 

1960 births
Living people
Footballers from Aberdeenshire
Scottish footballers
Association football central defenders
Montrose F.C. players
Nairn County F.C. players
Ellon United F.C. players
Deveronvale F.C. players
Scottish Football League players
Scottish football managers
Montrose F.C. managers
Peterhead F.C. managers
Scottish Football League managers
Cove Rangers F.C. managers